Mercedes Alonso (1913–2013) was a prolific Spanish film editor active from the 1940s through the 1990s.

Selected filmography 
 All Is Possible in Granada (1982)
 The House That Screamed (1970)
 I Do Not Forgive... I Kill! (1968)
 The Tough One (1966)
 Hands of a Gunfighter (1965)
 Seven Hours of Gunfire (1965)
 Hour of Death (1964)
 Cavalca e uccidi (1964)
 Four Bullets for Joe (1964)
 Implacable Three (1963)
 Héroes de blanco (1962)
 La rosa roja (1960)
 Nada menos que un arkángel (1960)
 El Vaquero and the Girl (1956)
 Terroristi a Madrid (1955)
 La patrulla (1954)
 Bella, la salvaje (1953)

References 

Spanish film editors
Spanish women film editors
1913 births
2013 deaths